Ludvig Mariboe (12 October 1781 – 19 June 1841) was a Norwegian businessman, publisher and politician.

References

1781 births
1841 deaths
Norwegian businesspeople
19th-century Norwegian politicians